Skull Island is a fictional island in the King Kong franchise.

Skull Island may also refer to:

Fiction
 Kong: Skull Island, 2017 American film 
 Skull Island: Reign of Kong, attraction at Universal's Islands of Adventure
 Skull Island (Braindead), in the 1992 film Braindead
 Skull Island (The Curse of Monkey Island), in the 1997 video game The Curse of Monkey Island

Geography
 Skull Island, a former island in Tulare Lake, California, US
 Skull Island, name given to Aureed Island, Queensland, Australia, in the 19th century
 Skull Island (Australia), in the Northern Territory of Australia
 Skull Island (New Brunswick), a small uninhabited Island in New Brunswick, Canada
 Skull Island (Washington), in Washington State, US
 Skull Islet, a small islet in British Columbia, Canada